United Nations Security Council Resolution 375, adopted on September 22, 1975, after examining the application of Independent State of Papua New Guinea for membership in the United Nations, the Council recommended to the General Assembly that Papua New Guinea be admitted.

See also
 List of United Nations Security Council Resolutions 301 to 400 (1971–1976)

References
Text of the Resolution at undocs.org

External links
 

 0375
 0375
 0375
1975 in Papua New Guinea
September 1975 events